Zairaini binti Sarbini (1 November 1972 – 9 August 2021) was a Malaysian freelance voice actress who dubbed for anime, foreign films, cartoons and TV programs in Malay that air on the Astro Ceria, Nickelodeon, Cartoon Network and Disney Channel Malaysia. She was also the aunt of the young Malay voice dubbing actor, Arfalie Fikrie Razali. She was formerly a voice actress at Filem Karya Nusa.

She first started voice acting at the Bukit Kepong theater in 1991, although, she did say that she felt a bit nervous when it was the first time performing a Malay voice role. Zairaini died due to cervical cancer on 9 August 2021 and was buried at Kampung Puah Islamic Cemetery in Gombak, Selangor.

Roles

Anime

Crayon Shin-chan - Midori Yoshinaga, Micchi Hatogaya, Ryuko Okegawa (2002–2008)
Doraemon - Shizuka Minamoto (1st voice)
Detective Conan - Conan Edogawa (2005–2008)
Naruto - Sakura Haruno, Hinata Hyuga (2005–2008)
Crush Gear Turbo - Kaoru Hanano
Futari wa Pretty Cure - Nagisa Misumi/Cure Black, Sanae Yukishiro
Ganso Tensai Bakabon - Hajime-chan
One Piece - Kaya, Bellemere, Nojiko, Tashigi, Carmen (Episodes 50 & 51), Apis (Episode 54 to 61)
Nintama Rantarō - Rantarō Inadera
Atashin'chi - Mikan Tachibana
Mirmo Zibang - Kaede Minami
Perman - Mitsuo Suwa (2006-2009)
Digimon Savers - Yoshino Fujieda
Ninja Hattori-kun - Ken'ichi Mitsuba
ToraDora - Taiga Aisaka
Hyperdimension Neptunia: The Animation - Histoire, Pirachu, Plutia/Iris Heart

Television Animated Series

Danny Phantom - Danny Phantom/Danny Fenton, Valerie Gray, Penelope Spectra (1 episode) (2006–2008)
Totally Spies! - Samantha "Sam" Simpson
Phineas and Ferb - Candace Flynn, Princess Baldegunde, Melissa, Inspector Initials, Stacy Hirano (1 episode), Vanessa Doofenshmirtz (11 episodes) (2008-20??)
SpongeBob SquarePants - Sandy Cheeks, Karen
The Garfield Show - Dr. Liz Wilson
Bananas in Pyjamas - Lulu
Avatar: The Last Airbender - Katara
Chalkzone - Rudy Tabootie, Queen Rapsheeba, Nurse Jenny, Spyfly, Weather Broadcaster
My Friend Rabbit - Hazel, Edwina, Amber Gibble, Coral Gibble, Jade Gibble
We Kids are Powerful (我们小孩有力量) - Xiao Mao, Ai Mei
Kitty Is Not a Cat - Kitty

Anime Films

King of Thorn - Kasumi Ishiki

Animated Films

Phineas and Ferb the Movie: Across the 2nd Dimension - Candace Flynn, Candace-2
A Goofy Movie - Roxanne, kid
An Extremely Goofy Movie - Beret Girl (Mocha Chino)
Finding Nemo - Dory
Bionicle 3: Web of Shadows - Roodaka

Live Action Television
Goosebumps - Carly Beth Caldwell (Kathryn Long) (Episodes: The Haunted Mask I and II)
Hannah Montana - Additional voices
The Suite Life of Zack & Cody - Additional voices

Live Action Films
The Chronicles of Narnia: The Lion, The Witch and the Wardrobe
The Pacifier - Zoe Plummer (Brittany Snow), Lulu Plummer (Morgan York)

References

1972 births
2021 deaths
Malaysian voice actresses
Place of birth missing
Malaysian people of Malay descent
Deaths from cancer in Malaysia
Deaths from cervical cancer